The  or  (literally " from a can") is a Japanese three-stringed folk plucked instrument, initially an improvised derivative of the Okinawan  that was developed in the Ryukyu Islands during the Shōwa period.

History
The  originates in the period following the World War II Battle of Okinawa. Okinawans, including men detained by the American military, made use of metal cans discarded by the Americans, and used them as the body for improvised . 

A similar type of can-based  was made by Japanese-Americans in internment camps in the United States during the war.

The  itself has also evolved to some degree, with certain makers creating more ornate instruments with hand-painted frontal designs and the decorative wrappings  that are a feature of the  proper. DIY "build-your-own"  kits are also readily available.

Construction and components 

It is normally an extension of the neck.
  — The long neck of the instrument is constructed from any one of an assortment of different types of wood. 
  — The , normally being a less costly instrument than a  proper, may have its strings made from any of a variety of materials. There is no normative material used for stringing. Nylon, sinew, metal wire and other materials may be used, depending upon the maker.

Notes

References

See also 
 Ryukyuan music

Further reading
 

Drumhead lutes
Necked lutes
Okinawan folk music